C85 may refer to :

 Ruy Lopez chess openings ECO code
 Other and unspecified types of non-Hodgkin's lymphoma ICD-10 code
 Labour Inspectorates (Non-Metropolitan Territories) Convention, 1947 code
 Continental C85, a 1944 engine
 C-85 Orion, a 1931 aircraft based on the Lockheed Model 9 Orion
 , a Mexican Navy ship, an Auk-class minesweeper originating in WWII
 C85, a Draft for Standard C programming language released in 1985 for ANSI C
 Caldwell 85 (IC 2391, the Omicron Velorum Cluster), an open cluster in the constellation Vela
 85th Comiket

See also

 
 
 85 (disambiguation)
 C (disambiguation)